Harry Feather (birth unknown – death unknown) was an English professional rugby league footballer who played in the 1900s and 1910s. He played at representative level for England, and at club level for Bradford FC and Bradford Northern, as a forward (prior to the specialist positions of), during the era of contested scrums. Prior to Tuesday 27 August 1895, Bradford FC was a rugby union club, it then became a rugby league club, and since 1907 it has been the association football (soccer) club Bradford Park Avenue.

Playing career

International honours
Harry (J.?) Feather won a cap for England while at Bradford FC in 1905 against Other Nationalities.

Championship final appearances
Harry Feather was a non-playing interchange/substitute to travel in Bradford FC's 5-0 victory over Salford in the Championship tiebreaker during the 1903–04 season at Thrum Hall, Hanson Lane, Halifax on Thursday 28 April 1904, in front of a crowd of 12,000.

Challenge Cup Final appearances
Harry Feather played as a forward, i.e. number 8, and was sent-off for fighting with Salford's Silas Warwick, in Bradford FC's 5-0 victory over Salford in the 1906 Challenge Cup Final during the 1905–06 season at Headingley Rugby Stadium, Leeds, on Saturday 28 April 1906, in front of a crowd of 15,834.

Note
Harry Feather' first initial is stated as J. on englandrl.co.uk, and rugbyleagueproject.org.

References

External links
[http://www.rlhp.co.uk/imagedetail.asp?id=1432 Image 
[http://www.rlhp.co.uk/imagedetail.asp?id=1433 Image 
Search for "Harry Feather" at britishnewspaperarchive.co.uk

Bradford Bulls players
Bradford F.C. players
England national rugby league team players
English rugby league players
Place of birth missing
Place of death missing
Rugby league forwards
Year of birth missing
Year of death missing